Goodyera tesselata is a plant in the orchid family (Orchidaceae), called by the common name checkered rattlesnake plantain. It is native to eastern Canada from Manitoba to Newfoundland, and to the northeastern United States from Maine to Maryland, west to Minnesota .

Goodyera tesselata has low basal leaves with white reticulated lines. The inflorescence is an upright stalk with small white flowers.

References

tesselata
Orchids of North America
Flora of Canada
Flora of the Northeastern United States
Plants described in 1824
Flora without expected TNC conservation status